Ann Uglialoro, known by her nickname Slugger Ann (April 30, 1906 – July 1, 1980) was famous as the owner of Slugger Ann's, a popular bar in the East Village area in New York City, which she operated from the 1950s until her death in 1980. She was also known as the grandmother of Jackie Curtis.

Personal life and career
Her daughters were Josephine and Jenevieve Uglialoro and she was of Italian descent. Jenevieve was the mother of performance artist Jackie Curtis. Jackie was mostly raised by Slugger Ann and was often seen visiting her at the bar. Some of Curtis's artistic output was inspired by the people who came to Slugger Ann's. Slugger Ann gave transgender icon Candy Darling a job working as a barmaid.
She got her nickname "Slugger Ann" from working as a taxi dancer in the 1920s and 1930s in New York City. If a man would attempt to grope her while she was dancing, she would swing at him. This behavior would come in handy when she opened a bar on the corner of 12th and 2nd Avenue, near St. Mark's Church in the early 1950s. She could be found each day at the bar. She lived in an apartment behind the bar and was the superintendent for the apartments above the building. Several television shows like Naked City were filmed outside the bar. Slugger Ann somewhat resembled Mae West, with a large frame and blond hair.

Later life and death
Slugger Ann's closed in 1980 when Ann Uglialoro died. It became a bar called La Bamba and the space is currently occupied by the 12th Street Ale House. Slugger Ann's is featured in many books about New York City nightlife and culture of the 1960s and 1970s. A stage play about Slugger Ann and Jackie Curtis has been in progress, written by her grandson Joe Preston.

References

1906 births
1980 deaths
Nightlife in New York City
20th-century American businesspeople
20th-century American businesswomen